Lewis Porter (born March 7, 1947) was an American and Canadian football player who played for the Hamilton Tiger-Cats and Kansas City Chiefs. He won the Grey Cup with Hamilton in 1972. He played college football at Southern University and A&M College.

References

1947 births
Living people
Kansas City Chiefs players
Hamilton Tiger-Cats players
Canadian football wide receivers
American football wide receivers
Southern Jaguars football players
Sportspeople from Clarksdale, Mississippi
Players of American football from Mississippi
American players of Canadian football